Barella is an Italian surname. Notable people with the surname include:

, French magistrate, trade unionist, and official
Mauro Barella (born 1956), Italian pole vaulter
Nicolò Barella (born 1997), Italian footballer

Italian-language surnames